Pearl Kibre (September 2, 1900 — July 15, 1985) was an American historian. She won a Guggenheim Fellowship in 1950 for her work on medieval science and universities.

Early life and education
Pearl Kibre was born in Philadelphia, Pennsylvania, the daughter of Kenneth Kibre, an optometrist born in Russia, and Jane du Pione Kibre. She moved to California as a girl with her parents; she attended Manual Arts High School in Los Angeles. Kibre attended the University of California at Berkeley as an undergraduate (1924) and master's (1925) student, and completed doctoral studies at Columbia University in 1936, with Lynn Thorndike as her mentor. She taught at Pasadena Junior College for a few years before resuming graduate work. (Her sister Adele Kibre also earned a Ph.D., in Latin Language and Literature, from the University of Chicago.)

Career
Pearl Kibre "helped lay the foundations for the contemporary study of medieval science and medieval universities." She was on the faculty of Hunter College from 1937 until she retired in 1971.  She helped found the doctoral program in history at the Graduate Center of the City University of New York.

In 1950 she was awarded a Guggenheim Fellowship to travel to European archives to study medieval universities. She became a corresponding member of the International Academy of the History of Science in 1960. Kibre was a member of the International Committee of Historical Sciences, the United States Subcommission for the History of Universities, and the editorial board of Medieval and Renaissance Latin Translations and Commentaries. She was elected a fellow of the Medieval Academy of America in 1964, the same year she won the Haskins Medal from the same organization.

Books by Pearl Kibre included The Library of Pico della Mirandola (1936), A Catalogue of Incipits of Mediaeval Scientific Writings in Latin (1937, revised 1963, with Lynn Thorndike), The Nations in the Mediaeval Universities (1948), Scholarly Privileges in the Middle Ages (1962), Hippocrates Latinus: Repertorium of Hippocratic Writings in the Latin Middle Ages, Volume 3 (1975), Studies in Medieval Science: Alchemy, Astrology, Mathematics, and Medicine (1984). In addition, an edited volume of essays was collected in her honor, Science, Medicine, and the University, 1200-1500 (1976); and she contributed to the Didascaliae, a volume of research using materials from the Vatican Library, presented to the Vatican in 1961.

Death and legacy
Pearl Kibre died in 1985, aged 84 years, at her home in New York City.

The Pearl Kibre Medieval Study is a study space maintained by an interdisciplinary graduate student organization at The Graduate Center, CUNY, begun in 1972 and named in her honor.

References

1900 births
1985 deaths
American people of Russian descent
University of California, Berkeley alumni
Columbia University alumni
Hunter College faculty
Graduate Center, CUNY faculty
Fellows of the Medieval Academy of America
American medievalists
Women medievalists
American women historians
Historians of science
American medical historians
20th-century American women